Grupa I (trans. Group I) was a Serbian and former Yugoslav new wave band from Belgrade, active in the late 1970s and early 1980s.

History 
The band was formed in January 1979 by guitarists Dejan Kostić and Predrag Mijović, drummer Branko "Mango" Kuštrin (former Tarkus member), bassist Branko Kojić (former Zdravo member), and vocalist Branko Bogićević. The lineup recorded their debut single "Sestra Vera" ("Sister Vera"), with "Miris ulice" ("The Smell of the Street") as the single B-side, released by PGP-RTB in 1979, after which Bogićević left the band, and bassist Kojić took over the vocal duties.

The debut album Na svom talasu (Making Our Waves), released by PGP-RTB in 1980, presented a combination of diverse musical influences, including hard rock, power pop, ska and reggae. The album, recorded at the PGP-RTB studio V, during the Summer 1980, featured the prominent tracks "Tinejdž bluz" ("Teenage Blues"), "G.S.B-S.O.S.", "Jugo rok" ("Yugo Rock"), featuring a quotation from the chorus of the Vatreni Poljubac song "Doktor za rokenrol" ("PhD for rock & roll"), and "Mirela" ("Mirella"), was produced by Slobodan Marković, who also appeared as song arranger and guest keyboard player. After the album release, guitarist Predrag Mijović left the band, quitting his musical career and moving to Botswana.

In the meantime, the band had released the single "Sa tobom, bez tebe" ("With You, Without You"), with "Bekstvo" ("Escape") as the B-side. The B-side appeared on the following studio album, I zvuci za I ljude (I Sounds for I People), also featuring the notable tracks "Nove vrednosti" ("New Values") and "Složena procedura opstanka" ("A Complex Survival Procedure"), mainly ska oriented. Guest appearances featured Vuk Vujačić (saxophone) and Disciplina Kičme frontman Dušan Kojić "Koja" (backing vocals), who also produced the dub version of "Nove vrednosti" which appeared on the four-track EP of the same name, released in 1982 by PGP-RTB. After the EP release, the band ceased to exist.

Post-breakup 
Kostić formed the influential alternative rock band Du-Du-A in 1981, with whom he continued working throughout the 1980s and the 1990s. He had also made a guest appearance on the Bebi Dol album Ruže i krv, playing guitar and bass, and wrote the music for the first Yugoslav movie to deal with drug abuse, Pejzaži u magli (Fogscapes).

Kuštrin made a guest appearance on the Du-Du-A debut single "Ja Tarzan ti Džejn" ("I Tarzan you Jane"), released in 1982. During the same year, on February, he became the drummer of Katarina II, and remained the band member until the following year. He had also performed with Doktor Spira i Ljudska Bića and Električni Orgazam, appearing on their debut self-titled album and the tour following the release of the 1983 cover album Les Chansones Populaires. He had committed suicide in 1985.

Legacy
Serbian alternative rock band Sinestezija released a cover of Grupa I song "Promene" ("Changes") on their 2016 album "Snovi o slobodi" ("Dreams of Freedom").

Discography

Studio albums 
 Na svom talasu (1980)
 I zvuci za I ljude (1981)

Extended plays 
 Nove vrednosti (1982)

Singles 
 "Sestra Vera" (1979)
 "Sa tobom, bez tebe" (1981)

See also 
 New wave music in Yugoslavia

References 

 EX YU ROCK enciklopedija 1960-2006, Janjatović Petar;

External links 
 Grupa I at Discogs
 Grupa I at YouTube
 Branko Kuštrin fan page at Facebook

 
 

Serbian hard rock musical groups
Serbian new wave musical groups
Serbian ska musical groups
Serbian power pop groups
Serbian pop rock music groups
Yugoslav rock music groups
Musical groups from Belgrade
Musical groups established in 1979
Musical groups disestablished in 1982